Chantal Lafon (born 14 December 1965) is a French rower. She competed at the 1988 Summer Olympics and the 1992 Summer Olympics.

References

1965 births
Living people
French female rowers
Olympic rowers of France
Rowers at the 1988 Summer Olympics
Rowers at the 1992 Summer Olympics
Place of birth missing (living people)
21st-century French women
20th-century French women